Per Fredrik Åsly, better known as PelleK (born Sandefjord, 21 December 1986) is a Norwegian singer, songwriter and actor.

Discography

Albums

Original albums

With Damnation Angels

With Timo Tolkki's Avalon 

 Timo Tolkki's Avalon: The Enigma Birth - 2021

Filmography

Film

Television

References

External links
 
 
 

21st-century Norwegian male singers
21st-century Norwegian singers
Norwegian heavy metal singers
Norwegian male film actors
Norwegian male television actors
Living people
21st-century Norwegian male actors
1986 births
People from Sandefjord
Cover artists
Video bloggers
Norwegian YouTubers